Cinema of Israel refers to film production in Israel since its founding in 1948. Most Israeli films are produced in Hebrew, but there are productions in other languages such as Arabic and English. Israel has been nominated for more Academy Awards for Best Foreign Language Film than any other country in the Middle East.

History

Pre-state films

Movies were made in Mandatory Palestine from the beginning of the silent film era although the development of the local film industry accelerated after the establishment of the state. Early films were mainly documentary or news roundups, shown in Israeli cinemas before the movie started.

In 1933, a children's book by Zvi Lieberman Oded ha-noded (Oded the Wanderer) was made into a silent film, the country's first full-length feature film for children, produced on a shoestring budget with private financing. In 1938, another book by Lieberman, Me’al ha-khoravot (Over the Ruins) was turned into a 70-minute film with a soundtrack and dialogue. Lieberman wrote the screenplay himself. Produced by Nathan Axelrod and directed by Alfred Wolf, it told the story of children in a Second Temple Jewish village in the Galilee where all the adults were killed by the Romans. The children rebuild the village. Production costs came to 1,000 Palestine pounds. It failed at the box office but is considered a landmark in the history of Israeli cinema.

One of the pioneers of cinema in Israel was Baruch Agadati.  Agadati purchased cinematographer Yaakov Ben Dov's film archives in 1934 when Ben Dov retired from filmmaking and together with his brother Yitzhak established the AGA Newsreel.  He directed the early Zionist film entitled This is the Land (1935).

State of Israel
In 1948, Yosef Navon, a soundman, and Abigail Diamond, American producer of the first Hebrew-language film at age 15, Baruch Agadati, found an investor, businessman  , who invested his own money in film and lab equipment. Agadati used his connections among Haganah comrades to acquire land for a studio. In 1949 the Geva Films studio was established on the site of an abandoned woodshed in Givatayim.

In 1954, the Knesset passed the Law for the Encouragement of Israeli Films (החוק לעידוד הסרט הישראלי). Leading filmmakers in the 1960s were Menahem Golan, Ephraim Kishon, and Uri Zohar.

The first Bourekas film was Sallah Shabati,  produced by Ephraim Kishon in 1964. In 1965, Uri Zohar produced the film Hole in the Moon, influenced by French New Wave films.

In the first decade of the 21st century,  several Israeli films won awards in film festivals around the world. Prominent films of this period include Late Marriage (Dover Koshashvili), Broken Wings, Walk on Water and Yossi & Jagger (Eytan Fox), Nina's Tragedies, Campfire and Beaufort (Joseph Cedar), Or (My Treasure) (Keren Yedaya), Turn Left at the End of the World (Avi Nesher), The Band's Visit (Eran Kolirin) Waltz with Bashir (Ari Folman), and Ajami. In 2011, Strangers No More won the Oscar for Best Short Documentary. In 2013 two documentaries were nominated the Oscar for the Best Feature Documentary: The Gatekeepers (Dror Moreh) and Five Broken Cameras, a Palestinian-Israeli-French co-production (Emad Burnat and Guy Davidi). In 2019, Synonyms (Nadav Lapid) won the Golden Bear award at the 69th Berlin International Film Festival. In 2021, Ahed's Knee, directed too by Lapid, was selected to compete for the Palme d'Or at the 2021 Cannes Film Festival and shared the Jury Prize.

Author Julie Gray notes, "Israeli film is certainly not new in Israel, but it is fast gaining attention in the U.S., which is a double-edged sword. American distributors feel that the small American audience interested in Israeli film, are squarely focused on the turbulent and troubled conflict that besets us daily."

In 2014 Israeli-made films sold 1.6 million tickets in Israel, the best in Israel's film history.

Genres

Documentary and propaganda films
Zionist documentary and/or propaganda films were shot both before and after 1948, often with the purpose of not just informing Jews living elsewhere, but also for attracting donations from them and for persuading them to immigrate. Among the pioneers who were active both as photographers and cinematographers are  Ya'acov Ben-Dov (1882–1968) and Lazar Dünner (most often spelled Dunner; 1912-1994). Dünner first worked as a cinematographer, gradually moving into other film-making tasks. In 1937 he shot the 15-minute film "A Day in Degania", in full colour, giving us a document about the first kibbutz some 27 years after it being established, and with the Nazi threat still "just" as a background threat, not fully mentioned by name. After the years of war, in 1949, Dünner would start churning out short documentaries of this type, narrated in English for the benefit of the mainly US public.

Bourekas films
Bourekas films (סרטי בורקס) were a film genre popular in  the 1960s and 1970s. Central themes include ethnic tensions between the Ashkenazim and the Mizrahim or Sephardim and the conflict between rich and poor. The term was supposedly coined by the Israeli film director Boaz Davidson, the creator of several such films, as a play-on-words, after "spaghetti Western:" just as the Western subgenre was named after a notable dish of its country of filming, so the Israeli genre was named after the notable Israeli dish, Bourekas.  Bourekas films are further characterized by accent imitations (particularly of Jewish people originating from Morocco, Persia, and Poland); a combination of melodrama, comedy and slapstick; and alternate identities. Bourekas films were successes at the box office but panned by the critics.  They included comedy films such as Charlie Ve'hetzi and Hagiga B'Snuker and sentimental melodramas such as Nurit.  Prominent filmmakers in this genre during this period include Boaz Davidson, Ze'ev Revach, Yehuda Barkan and George Ovadiah.

New sensitivity films
The "New sensitivity films" (סרטי הרגישות החדשה) is a movement which started during the 1960s and lasted until the end of the 1970s. The movement sought to create a cinema in modernist cinema with artistic and esthetic values, in the style of the new wave films of the French cinema. The "New sensitivity" movement produced social artistic films such as But Where Is Daniel Wax? by Avraham Heffner.  The Policeman Azoulay (Ephraim Kishon), I Love You Rosa and The House on Chelouche Street by Moshé Mizrahi were candidates for an Oscar Award in the foreign film category. One of the most important creators in this genre is Uri Zohar, who directed Hor B'Levana (Hole In The Moon) and Three Days and a Child.

Movie theaters
In the early 1900s, silent movies were screened in sheds, cafes and other temporary structures. In 1905, Cafe Lorenz opened on Jaffa Road in the new Jewish neighborhood of Neve Tzedek. From 1909, the Lorenz family began screening movies at the cafe. In 1925, the Kessem Cinema was housed there for a short time. Silent films were screened there, accompanied by commentary and piano playing by a member of the Templer community.

In 1953, Cinema Keren, the Negev's first movie theater, opened in Beersheba. It was built by the Histadrut and had seating for 1,200 people.

In 1966, 2.6 million Israelis went to the cinema over 50 million times. In 1968, when television broadcasting began, theaters began to close down, first in the periphery, then in major cities. Three hundred thirty standalone theaters were torn down or redesigned as multiplex theaters.

Eden Cinema, Tel Aviv
The Eden Cinema (Kolnoa Eden) was built in 1914. The building, which still stands at the beginning of Lilienblum Street in Neve Tzedek, had two 800-seat halls: a roofed one for winter and an outdoor hall for screenings in the  pre-air-conditioning summer heat. Owners Mordechai Abarbanel and Moshe Visser were granted a 13-year exclusive municipal license. When Eden’s monopoly expired in 1927, other cinemas sprang up around Tel Aviv.

During World War I, the theater was shut down by order of the Ottoman government on the pretext that its generator could be used to send messages to enemy submarines off shore. It reopened to the public during the British Mandate and became a hub of cultural and social activity. It closed down in 1974.

Mograbi Cinema, Tel Aviv
The Mograbi Cinema (Kolnoa Mograbi) opened in 1930. The cinema was established by Yaakov Mograbi, an affluent Jewish merchant who immigrated from Damascus, at the request of Meir Dizengoff, then mayor of Tel Aviv. The building housed two large halls: on the upper floor a cinema with a sliding roof which could be opened in the hot summer days, and a performance hall which was the venue of the first Hebrew theaters, among them Hamatateh, HaOhel, Habima, and the Cameri. It was designed by architect Joseph Berlin in an art deco style that was popular in cinemas worldwide.  People gathered in front of the theater to dance in the streets when the UN General Assembly voted in favor of the Partition Plan in November 1947. After a fire in the summer of 1986 due to an electric short circuit, the building was demolished. In 2011, plans were submitted to rebuild a replica of the original cinema with a luxury high-rise above it.

Allenby Cinema, Tel Aviv
The Allenby Cinema was designed by Shlomo Gepstein, an Odessa-born architect who immigrated to Palestine in the 1920s. It was a  large, imposing building in the International Style. In the 1900s, it housed Allenby 58, a famous nightclub.

Armon Cinema, Haifa
In 1931, Moshe Greidinger opened a cinema in Haifa. In 1935 he built a second movie theater, Armon, a large art-deco building with 1,800 seats that became the heart of Haifa's entertainment district. It was also used as a performance venue by the Israel Philharmonic Orchestra and the Israeli Opera.

Alhambra Cinema, Jaffa
The art deco Alhambra cinema, with seating for 1,100, opened in Jaffa in 1937. It was designed by a Lebanese architect, Elias al-Mor, and became a popular venue for concerts of Arab music. Farid al-Atrash and Umm Kulthum appeared there. In 2012, the historic building reopened as a Scientology center after two years of renovation.

Smadar Theater, Jerusalem
The Smadar theater was built in Jerusalem's German Colony in 1928. It was German-owned and mainly served the British Army. In 1935, it opened for commercial screenings as the "Orient Cinema." It was turned over to Jewish management to keep it from being boycotted as a German business, infuriating the head of the Nazi Party branch in Jerusalem. After 1948, it was bought by four demobilized soldiers, one of them Arye Chechik, who bought out his partners in 1950. According to a journalist who lived next door, Chechik sold the tickets, ran to collect them at the door and worked as the projectionist. His wife ran the concession stand.

Cinema festivals 

The main international film festivals in Israel are the Jerusalem Film Festival and the Haifa Film Festival.

Cinema awards
 Ophir Award
 Wolgin Award

Film schools
 Sam Spiegel Film and Television School
 Ma'aleh School of Television, Film and the Arts

See also

 Culture of Israel
 Israeli films of the 1950s
 Jewish culture#Cinema
 List of Israeli films
 List of Israeli submissions for the Academy Award for Best Foreign Language Film
 Media of Israel
 Edison Theater (Jerusalem)

References

Further reading
 Israel Studies 4.1, Spring 1999 - Special Section: Films in Israeli Society (pp. 96–187).
 Amy Kronish, World cinema: Israel, Trowbridge, Wiltshire: Flicks Books [etc.], 1996.
 Amy Kronish and Costel Safirman, Israeli film: a reference guide, Westport, Conn. [etc.]: Praeger, 2003.
 Gilad Padva. Discursive Identities in the (R)evolution of the New Israeli Queer Cinema. In Talmon, Miri and Peleg, Yaron (Eds.), Israeli Cinema: Identities in Motion (pp. 313–325). Austin, TX: Texas University Press, 2011.
 Ella Shohat, Israeli cinema: East West and the politics of representation, Austin: Univ. of Texas Pr., 1989.
 Gideon Kouts, The Representation of the Foreigner in Israeli Films (1966–1976), REEH The European Journal of Hebrew Studies, Paris: 1999 (Vol. 2), pp. 80– 108.
Dan Chyutin and Yael Mazor, Israeli Cinema Studies: Mapping Out a Field, Shofar: An Interdisciplinary Journal of Jewish Studies 38.1 (Spring 2020).
Ido Rosen. "National Fears in Israeli Horror Films." Jewish Film & New Media 8.1 (2020): 77-103.

External links

 Israel Film Festival
 Israeli cinematographers win prestigious awards at the 60th Cannes Film Festival. 28 May 2007
 Israeli Film, Home of the Early Israeli & Hebrew Film
Oded Hanoded First Israeli Drama film
 Israeli Film Fund
 Israel Film Center Database of Israeli films, news about Israeli cinema, calendar of screenings in the USA